was an autobahn in Germany. It led around Schwerin and is now part of the A 14.

An extension of the autobahn to the A 20 had been planned in 1992, but failed to be realized due to financial and environmental factors. The current extension will not be finished before 2009.

The former A 241 never carried much traffic because Schwerin can be reached from the A 24, a much shorter connection. Also, Wismar could only be reached from the A 241 by driving through narrow avenues, so that the B 106 became the preferred route. More traffic can be expected to flow once the gap is closed and the junction Schwerin-Süd is finished.

On 24 August 2006 the section between the Kreuz Wismar and Jesendorf junctions was opened for traffic. This 11 km long segment of the road cost over €50 million  to construct. Once completed, the A 241 will be renumbered as part of the A 14.

Exit list 

 

|-
|colspan="3"|

 
 
|-
|colspan="3"|

 

 (later Schwerin-Mitte) 

|-
|colspan="3"|

 
| Connection to  planned 
|}

External links 

241
A241